Shigurui is a manga series written and illustrated by Takayuki Yamaguchi.

Volume list

|}

References

External links
 

Shigurui